Nakornpayap International School is a K-12 International school founded in 1993 in Chiang Mai, Thailand offering an American style curriculum.

Nakornpayap International School (NIS) was founded by Orawan Chaisorn and later purchased by Piti Yimprasert. Since 2000, NIS has been accredited by the Western Association of Schools and Colleges (WASC) is an official academic body responsible for the accreditation of public and private universities, colleges, secondary and elementary schools in California and Hawaii, the territories of Guam, American Samoa and Northern Marianas Islands, in addition to the Marshall Islands, Federated States of Micronesia, Palau, the Pacific Rim, East Asia, and areas of the Pacific and East Asia.

NIS celebrated its 25-year anniversary in 2018. It is one of the two oldest, non-denominational international school in Chiang Mai. With teachers and students representing over 30 countries around the globe, NIS proudly embodies the message of its motto: Education Through Diversity.

References

External links
 

American international schools in Thailand
International schools in Chiang Mai
Educational institutions established in 1993
1993 establishments in Thailand